The Law and the Lady may refer to:
 The Law and the Lady (novel), an 1875 detective story by Wilkie Collins
 The Law and the Lady (1924 film), an American silent drama film
 The Law and the Lady (1951 film), an American comedy film